3 STR is a census town in Ganganagar district  in the state of Rajasthan, India.

Demographics
 India census, 3 STR had a population of 10,925. Males constitute 54% of the population and females 46%. 3 STR has an average literacy rate of 62%, higher than the national average of 59.5%; with 60% of the males and 40% of females literate. 16% of the population is under 6 years of age.

References

Villages in Sri Ganganagar district